Three-point lighting is a standard method used in visual media such as theatre, video, film, still photography, computer-generated imagery and 3D computer graphics. By using three separate positions, the photographer can illuminate the shot's subject (such as a person) however desired, while also controlling (or eliminating entirely) the shading and shadows produced by direct lighting.

Setup

Key Light 
The key light, as the name suggests, shines directly upon the subject and serves as its principal illuminator; more than anything else, the strength, color and angle of the key determines the shot's overall lighting design.

In indoor shots, the key is commonly a specialized lamp, or a camera's flash. In outdoor daytime shots, the Sun often serves as the key light. In this case, of course, the photographer cannot set the light in the exact position they want, so instead arranges the shot to best capture the sunlight, perhaps after waiting for the sun to position itself just right.

Fill Light 

The fill light also shines on the subject, but from a side angle relative to the key and is often placed at a lower position than the key (about at the level of the subject's face). It balances the key by illuminating shaded surfaces, and lessening or eliminating chiaroscuro effects, such as the shadow cast by a person's nose upon the rest of the face. It is usually softer and less bright than the key light (up to half), and more to a flood. Not using a fill at all can result in stark contrasts (due to shadows) across the subject's surface, depending upon the key light's harshness. Sometimes, as in low-key lighting, this is a deliberate effect, but shots intended to look more natural and less stylistic require a fill.

In some situations a photographer can use a reflector (such as a piece of white cardstock mounted off-camera, or even a white-painted wall) as a fill light instead of an actual lamp. Reflecting and redirecting the key light's rays back upon the subject from a different angle can cause a softer, subtler effect than using another lamp.

Backlight 
The backlight (a.k.a. the rim, hair, or shoulder light) shines on the subject from behind, often (but not necessarily) to one side or the other.  It gives the subject a rim of light, serving to separate the subject from the background and highlighting contours.

Back light or rim light is different from a kick in that a kick (or kicker) contributes to a portion of the shading on the visible surface of the subject, while a rim light only creates a thin outline around the subject without necessarily hitting the front (visible) surface of the subject at all.

In theatre
A three-point system in theatre can be used in a variety of ways to help set a mood of the character. By having bright key light, but minimal fill and back light, this will give the effect of anger, whereas if the scene is very brightly lit with little shadow on the actor, this can make the scene look very happy.

Four-point lighting

The addition of a fourth light, the background light, makes for a four-point lighting setup.

The background light is placed behind the subject(s), on a high grid, or low to the ground.  Unlike the other three lights, which illuminate foreground elements like actors and props, it illuminates background elements, such as walls or outdoor scenery.  This technique can be used to eliminate shadows cast by foreground elements onto the background, or to draw more attention to the background.  It also helps to off-set the single eye nature of the camera, this means that it helps the camera give depth to the subject.

References

External links
Three-Point Lighting - University of Washington
Studio lighting - Harding University

Cinematography
Photographic techniques
Photographic lighting
Stage lighting
Articles containing video clips